State Road 317 (NM 317) is a  state highway in the US state of New Mexico. NM 317's western terminus is a continuation as Indian Service Route 61 at the end of state maintenance west of Isleta Village Proper, and the eastern terminus is at NM 45 west of Isleta Village Proper.

Major intersections

See also

References

317
Transportation in Bernalillo County, New Mexico